Nirbhaya Dihra is a village located in Tarari block of Bhojpur district in Bihar. This village has total 157 families residing. Nirbhay Dehra has population of 1057 as per government records.

Administration
Nirbhay Dehra village is administrated by Gram Pradhan through its Gram Panchayat, who is elected representative of village as per constitution of India and Panchyati Raj Act.

Nereby places
 Buxar
 Arrah
 Dumraon
 Patna

References

External links
Villages in Bhojpur, Bihar 

Villages in Bhojpur district, India